The militia portalis, also known as peasant militia, was the first institution that secured the peasants' permanent participation in the defence of the Kingdom of Hungary. It was established when the Diet of Hungary obliged all landowners to equip one archer for 20 peasant plots on their estates to serve in the royal army in 1397. The unprofessional soldiers were to serve in the militia only during the emergency period.

References

Sources 

 
 
 

Military units and formations of Hungary